Fam Kristina Ekman (born 6 October 1946) is a Swedish－Norwegian children's writer and illustrator.

Early life 
She was born in Stockholm, Sweden to actors Hasse Ekman and Eva Henning, and moved to Oslo in 1954.

Career 

She has received several prizes for her art work, and is represented in the Norwegian National Museum of Art, Architecture and Design.

Notable works 
 Hva skal vi gjøre med lille Jill?
 Kall meg onkel Alf

Awards 
Brage Prize 1992
Norwegian Critics Prize for the year's best children's or youth's literature 2007

References

1946 births
Living people
Norwegian children's writers
Norwegian children's book illustrators
Norwegian women illustrators
Norwegian women children's writers
Writers from Oslo
Swedish emigrants to Norway
Artists from Oslo